John  Michael Lane (February 14, 1936October 21, 2020) was an American epidemiologist who was a director of the Epidemic Intelligence Service's Global Smallpox Eradication program from 1973 to 1981, and who played a leading role in the eradication of smallpox in 1977.

Early life 
John Michael Lane was born on February 14, 1936, in Boston, Massachusetts, to Eileen O'Connor and Alfred Baker Lewis.  His mother was on the national board of the YWCA and a director of Planned Parenthood, and his father was a pro bono lawyer for the early NAACP and later a treasurer of the organization.  Lane had two brothers, a half-brother, and two half-sisters. When he was six, his family moved to Greenwich, Connecticut, where Lane studied at the private Brunswick School.  He graduated with a bachelor's degree from Yale University in 1957; a medical degree from Harvard University in 1961; and a public health epidemiology degree from the University of California, Berkeley in 1967.  Lane completed his internship at the Bellevue Hospital, in New York.

Career 
Lane started his career as an epidemiologist with the Centers for Disease Control and Prevention's (CDC) Epidemic Intelligence Service in 1963. He was assigned to the smallpox and other infectious diseases division within CDC. During this time, he traveled to countries in Africa and south-east Asia, including Pakistan, India, Bangladesh, and Indonesia, to undertake vaccination campaigns and combat outbreaks of the disease.

In 1973, Lane was appointed as the director of the Global Smallpox Eradication program. He served in this position through 1981 as the last director of the program, successfully overseeing the eradication of the disease in 1977.  The last case of the disease was reported in Somalia in 1977, and it was declared as having been eradicated in 1980.  Speaking later about the strategies adopted, Lane recounted the role of volunteers who administered the vaccines, and the vaccination process itself.  He spoke of the importance of cooperating with local tribal regional leaders to ensure that the programs were administered to local populations. An additional strategy that was adopted to circumvent the shortage of vaccines was to move from 'mass vaccination' to 'ring vaccination', with the latter strategy focused on 'surveillance and containment', and targeted vaccination within villages with known victims. 

Following his role with the Smallpox Eradication program, Lane stayed with the CDC through 1987 as a director of the Center for Prevention Services.  He went on to teach at Emory University in Atlanta between 1988 and 1991, and at the Australian National University between 1991 and 1993, where he helped set up the Australian Field Epidemiology Training Program and served as the program director.  Lane returned to teach at Emory University in 1993 and continued through 2001.  

In the early 21st century, Lane was a proponent for the destruction of the existing stocks of smallpox vaccine because of its potential usage as a bio-terrorist weapon, and pleaded that Russia and the United States destroy their remaining vaccines.

Personal life 
Lane married Carolina Hernandez in 1969. The couple divorced in 1998.  He subsequently married Lila Elizabeth Summer in 1998. Lane was an avid bird-watcher, trekker, and scuba diver. He completed a trek across the United States from Atlanta to Seattle when he was 79.

Lane died from colon cancer on October 21, 2020, at his home in Atlanta.

Select publications

References 

Scientists from Boston
Physicians from Massachusetts
American epidemiologists
2020 deaths
1936 births
Yale University alumni
Harvard Medical School alumni
University of California, Berkeley alumni
Academic staff of the Australian National University
Emory University faculty
20th-century American scientists
21st-century American scientists
Centers for Disease Control and Prevention people
Deaths from colorectal cancer
Deaths from cancer in Georgia (U.S. state)